Warakas is administrative village (kelurahan in Indonesian) at  Tanjung Priok subdistrict, North Jakarta. The border of Papanggo are : 
 Tanjung Priok administrative village in the north
 Papanggo administrative village in the west and in the south
 Sungai Bambu administrative village in the east

The zip code of this administrative village is 14340.

Toponymy
The name Warakas is come from Javanese for the kind of fern, which is have genus name Acrostichum aureum

External links
 http://www.bappedajakarta.go.id/linkjktutara.asp

Administrative villages in Jakarta